In the 2012–13 season, JSM Béjaïa competed in the Ligue 1 for the 13th season, as well as the Algerian Cup. They competed in Ligue 1, the Algerian Cup the Champions League and the Confederation Cup.

Squad list
Players and squad numbers last updated on 18 November 2010.Note: Flags indicate national team as has been defined under FIFA eligibility rules. Players may hold more than one non-FIFA nationality.

Competitions

Overview

{| class="wikitable" style="text-align: center"
|-
!rowspan=2|Competition
!colspan=8|Record
!rowspan=2|Started round
!rowspan=2|Final position / round
!rowspan=2|First match	
!rowspan=2|Last match
|-
!
!
!
!
!
!
!
!
|-
| Ligue 1

|  
| 11th
| 15 September 2012
| 21 May 2013
|-
| Algerian Cup

| Round of 64 
| Round of 32
| 15 December 2012
| 29 December 2012
|-
| Champions League

| Preliminary round 
| Second round
| 6 December 2012
| 18 February 2013
|-
| Confederation Cup

| colspan=2| Play-off round 
| 18 May 2013
| 2 June 2013
|-
! Total

Ligue 1

League table

Results summary

Results by round

Matches

Algerian Cup

Champions League

Preliminary round

First round

Second round

Confederation Cup

Play-off round

Squad information

Playing statistics

|-
! colspan=14 style=background:#dcdcdc; text-align:center| Goalkeepers

|-
! colspan=14 style=background:#dcdcdc; text-align:center| Defenders

|-
! colspan=14 style=background:#dcdcdc; text-align:center| Midfielders

|-
! colspan=14 style=background:#dcdcdc; text-align:center| Forwards

|-
! colspan=14 style=background:#dcdcdc; text-align:center| Players transferred out during the season

Goalscorers
Includes all competitive matches. The list is sorted alphabetically by surname when total goals are equal.

Transfers

In

Out

References

JSM Béjaïa seasons
Algerian football clubs 2012–13 season